Boving (or typographical variants Bøving and Böving) may refer to:

Adam Giede Böving (1869–1957), Danish-American entomologist
Bøving Island, small island in Newcomb Bay, Antarctica